Phil Carlton may refer to:

 J. Phil Carlton (born 1938), North Carolina judge
 Phil Carlton (footballer) (born 1953), Australian rules footballer